

Events

May events
 May 1 – Opening of first railway in Burma (Myanmar), from Rangoon (Yangon) to Prome (Pyay) ( of metre gauge).

July events

 July 14 – Baltimore railroad strike of 1877: Workers on the Baltimore and Ohio Railroad walk off their jobs in an act that is seen as the start of the great railroad strike of 1877.
 July 16
 Railroad workers on strike in Martinsburg, West Virginia, derail and loot a train; West Virginia Governor Henry M. Mathews calls on United States President Rutherford B. Hayes for Federal troops to break the strike.
 The Nickey line, connecting Boxmoor to Harpenden in England, is officially opened.
 July 19 – The New York and Manhattan Beach Railway (later absorbed by the Long Island Rail Road) opens.
 July 20 – Baltimore and Ohio Railroad workers riot in Baltimore, Maryland. Nine railroad employees are killed as the Maryland militia attempts to quell the riot.
 July 21 – Baltimore and Ohio Railroad workers in Pittsburgh, Pennsylvania, stage a sympathy strike for the workers killed in Baltimore, Maryland the day before. Rioting erupts throughout Pittsburgh as a result.
 July 24 – Joel Tiffany is awarded  for his design of the first successful refrigerator car.

August events 
 August 31 – The first  gauge narrow gauge railroad in America, the Billerica and Bedford Railroad, begins operations.

October events 
 October 28 – Replacement Budapest-Nyugati Railway Terminal, constructed by Eiffel, opened in the Austro-Hungarian Empire.

November events 
 November 4 – Opening of Gustave Eiffel's Maria Pia Bridge carrying the railway across the Douro into Porto, Portugal.

December events 
 December 27 – The Quebec, Montreal, Ottawa and Occidental Railway opens, traversing a route from Montreal through Lachute to Hull.

Unknown date events
 Tracks of the Southern Pacific Railroad from Los Angeles, cross the Colorado River at Yuma, Arizona.
 William Henry Vanderbilt, son of Cornelius Vanderbilt, is promoted to President of the New York Central system.
 Second railway in Estonia connecting Tapa (on the Tallinn–Saint Petersburg line) with Tartu, the biggest city in Southern Estonia (at this time in the Governorate of Livonia) is opened.
 Opening of first public railway in Venezuela, the  Bolivar Railway (Ferrocarril Bolívar,  gauge).
 Approximate date – Ephraim Shay develops the first Shay locomotive.

Births

March births 
 March 7 – Walter Kidde, president of New York, Susquehanna and Western Railway 1937–1943 (d. 1943).

Unknown date births
 Edgar Alcock, general manager and chairman of Hunslet Engine Company of Leeds, England (d. 1951).

Deaths

January deaths
 January 4 – Cornelius Vanderbilt, American financier who created the New York Central and Hudson River Railroad from the merger of several smaller New York railroads (b. 1794).

March deaths 
 March 9 – Oliver Ames Jr., president of Union Pacific Railroad 1866–1871, brother of Oakes Ames (b. 1807).

April deaths 
 April 22 – James P. Kirkwood, designer of Starrucca Viaduct (b. 1807).

May deaths 
 May 19 – Matthew Baird, second owner of Baldwin Locomotive Works (b. 1817).

August deaths
 August 3 – William Butler Ogden, president of the Chicago and North Western Railway (b. 1805).

September deaths 
 September 2 – Alvin Adams, founder of Adams Express, one of the first LCL freight companies in the United States, dies (b. 1804).

December events 
 December 26 – Jean-Jacques Meyer, French-born steam locomotive designer (b. 1804)

References
 Brief biographies of major mechanical engineers.  Retrieved February 9, 2005.
 Rivanna Chapter, National Railway Historical Society (2005), This Month in Railroad History: July.  Retrieved July 12 and July 22, 2005.